An Ohnosecond (alternatively Onosecond) is the fraction of time before one realizes that they have made a crucial mistake after the mistake was made.

Etymology 
The term is generally considered a slang term, and is believed to originate from Elizabeth Powell Crowe's 1993 novel,  "The Electric Traveler." The word is a portmanteau of the phrase, "Oh, no!" and the word "second."

References

Slang